The Dinadiawan River Protected Landscape is a protected area covering the stretch of the Dinadiawan River from its headwaters in the Sierra Madre mountain range to its mouth on the Philippine Sea coast of the village of Dinadiawan in Aurora province, Philippines. Its forest cover consists primarily of dipterocarp trees like tanguile, mayapis, white lauan, red lauan and bagtikan. It serves as a habitat of wild fauna such as the Philippine deer, Philippine long-tailed macaque, Philippine warty pig, spotted wood kingfisher and pygmy swiftlet.

First established as a watershed forest reserve with an area of  through Proclamation No. 918 issued by President Corazón Aquino in 1992, the protected area is now a declared Protected Landscape under the National Integrated Protected Areas System with the issuance of Proclamation No. 278 in 2000 by President Joseph Estrada.

The park is one of five protected areas in the province of Aurora.

References

Protected landscapes of the Philippines
Geography of Aurora (province)
Protected areas of the Sierra Madre (Philippines)
Protected areas established in 1992
1992 establishments in the Philippines